was an early Heian period Buddhist monk and waka poet.

Tsurayuki says the following to comment on Kisen's work:

The following two  are the only poems that can be confidently traced back to him:

References 
This article is based on material from the equivalent article in the Japanese Wikipedia.

Japanese poets
People of Heian-period Japan
Year of birth unknown
Year of death unknown
Hyakunin Isshu poets
Heian period Buddhist clergy